The Loves of Mary, Queen of Scots is a 1923 British silent historical film directed by Denison Clift and starring Fay Compton, Gerald Ames and Ivan Samson. The film depicts the life of Mary, Queen of Scots, and her eventual execution. It was one of the final films made by Ideal, one of the leading British studios, before they were hit by the Slump of 1924.

Cast
 Fay Compton as Mary Stuart
 Gerald Ames as Bothwell
 Ivan Samson as Lord Dudley
 John Stuart as George Douglas
 Ellen Compton as Queen Elizabeth I of England
 Lionel d'Aragon as Moray
 Harvey Braban as Ruthven
 Irene Rooke as Catherine de' Medici
 Donald Macardle as Francis II
 René Maupré as Rizzio
 Ernest A. Douglas as Cardinal
 Sydney Seaward as Lord Douglas
 Edward Sorley as John Knox
 Betty Faire as Mary Beaton
 Dorothy Fane as Mary Beaton
 Nancy Kenyon as Mary Fleming
 Julie Hartley-Milburn as Mary Seaton
 Basil Rathbone (uncredited)
 Jack Cardiff (uncredited)

References

Bibliography
 Low, Rachael. The History of British Film, Volume 4 1918-1929. Routledge, 1997.

External links
 

1923 films
1920s historical films
British biographical films
British historical films
British silent feature films
Ideal Film Company films
Films set in the 16th century
Films set in Scotland
Films set in England
Films directed by Denison Clift
Cultural depictions of Mary, Queen of Scots
Cultural depictions of Elizabeth I
Cultural depictions of Catherine de' Medici
British black-and-white films
1920s English-language films
1920s British films